"Just to See Her" is a 1987 song written by Jimmy George and Lou Pardini and recorded by American R&B recording artist Smokey Robinson from his studio album One Heartbeat (1987).

"Just to See Her" peaked at No. 7 in Cash Box and No. 8 on the Billboard Hot 100 in June 1987. It also reached No. 2 on the R&B chart and hit No. 1 on the Adult Contemporary chart. In the United Kingdom, the song peaked at No. 52 on the Singles Chart.

Robinson won his first career Grammy Award for Best Male R&B Vocal Performance at the 30th Grammy Awards in 1988.

Charts

Other recordings
Lou Pardini released his version in 1996.
Andy Williams released a version in 2007 on his album, I Don't Remember Ever Growing Up.
Filipino singer Jay R covered the song on his 2008 album Soul in Love.
American Jazz & R&B Singer Phil Perry covered his version on his album Mighty to Love in 2013.

References

Whitburn, Joel (1996). The Billboard Book of Top 40 Hits, 6th Edition (Billboard Publications)

1986 songs
1987 singles
Contemporary R&B ballads
1980s ballads
Smokey Robinson songs
Motown singles